The 1931–32 season was Port Vale's 26th season of football in the English Football League, and their second successive season (25th overall) in the Second Division. Aiming to build on their fifth place finish in 1930–31 and to win promotion, they finished in 20th place, only avoiding relegation on the last day thanks to their superior goal average – having a 0.048 better average than Barnsley. Their one highlight of the season was a 3–0 home win over rivals Stoke City that helped to deny Stoke a promotion place – however City comfortably took revenge at the last end of season North Staffordshire Infirmary Cup match, beating Vale 7–0. Manager Tom Morgan was also let go at this time, replaced by former manager Tom Holford. The season was notable for the debut of Tom Nolan, whose goalscoring exploits at the club would be a point of pride in an otherwise miserable pre-war period.

Overview

Second Division
The pre-season saw the departure of Phil Griffiths to Second Division champions Everton for £6,000; whilst Jack Simms and Harry Anstiss departed for Swansea Town. In came Dicky York, Arthur Dorrell, Billy Easton, Tom Tippett, and George Poyser. Dorrell and York arrived from First Division runners-up Aston Villa, and the ageing wingers had England caps to their names. Easton had a proven goalscoring record at Swansea, and Tippett and Pyser arrived from Rochdale and Mansfield Town respectively. Big things were expected, and season ticket sales were up by 300% on the previous season.

The season began with a 3–1 win at Plymouth Argyle's Home Park, with Sam Jennings scoring a brace. The first home match took place in front of a new £10,351 stand; yet Leeds United took home the points. In September Jennings was sold to Stockport County, and Stewart Littlewood took his place in the first eleven. Two close run victories followed that saw eleven goals scored, however performances tailed off until 26 September when Stoke City romped to a 4–0 victory at the Victoria Ground. "Inferior in all departments", the "Valiants" changed their line-up following the defeat, 'resting' Littlewood – this resulted in a four match unbeaten streak. The next month saw the arrival of centre-forward Tom Nolan from Manchester Central. Harry Marshall was attracting praise for his performances in the half-back role, however Tippett was criticized for his lack of goals. Due to the Great Depression, the bank refused to allow an extension to the club's £5,000 overdraft, and so the club controversially sent notice to other clubs that it would consider offers for its players in order to raise the funds to buy new players.

On 21 November they lost 9–3 to Tottenham Hotspur at White Hart Lane. This twelve goal match is still a club record. On 12 December they suffered the division's biggest home defeat of the season, going down 7–1 to eventual free-scoring champions Wolverhampton Wanderers. Going into their Boxing day win over Notts County they had lost seven of their previous nine games, conceding 33 goals. A holiday break in Llandudno seemed the raise the team's spirits, as two further 2–0 victories followed. In January Wilf Kirkham was re-signed from Stoke, to the delight of fans. On 6 February he took part in a morale-boosting 3–0 home win over Stoke in front of 21,089 fans – an attendance that raised £1,350 of funds. The referee T.Crew also enjoyed the game, congratulating both sides on a sporting display that "was the most pleasurable game he had ever officiated". Vale followed this by picking just four points in their next thirteen games to almost certainly doom the club to relegation – crucially though were the two points they earned from a 3–0 win over Barnsley. With two games to go they were three points (and inferior goal average) behind the tykes. After a 2–1 win over Chesterfield matched by a 4–1 home defeat by Barnsley, they were just behind by a single point. Vale's final game of the season was against already promoted second place Leeds United – a 'convincing' 2–0 victory followed at Elland Road. Barnsley only managed a 2–2 draw, and so Vale leapfrogged Barnsley to reach the safety of 20th place.

They finished 20th due to their superior goal average. However with 58 goals scored, their attack was the third worst in the division; whilst their 89 goals conceded made them the second leakiest defence in the division. Lacking a consistent goalscorer, top-scorers Nolan and Tippett failed to reach twenty goals between them. Losing half their games, their statistic of nine home defeats was particularly worrying.

Lucky to still be a second tier club, a clear-out followed. Impressive Harry Marshall was sold to Tottenham Hotspur, whilst 323 league-game eleven-year club veteran Bob Connelly was handed a free transfer to Congleton Town. Joseph Chell and Clarence Spencer were also released, signing for Stoke City and Norwich City respectively. Arthur Dorrell and Dicky York's best days were well behind them, as Dorrell retired and York signed with Brierley Hill Alliance. Manager Tom Morgan meanwhile reverted to his old position as assistant secretary, replaced at the helm by former manager Tom Holford.

Finances
On the financial side, gate receipts were at £12,170 – their lowest total since re-joining the Football League in 1919. However 'rigid economy' ensured a profit of £873.

Cup competitions
In the FA Cup, they travelled to Brighton & Hove Albion's Goldstone Ground of the Third Division South. They progressed with a 2–1 victory thanks to two strikes from Nolan. Coming up against First Division Leicester City in the Fourth Round, they were defeated 2–1 in front of 20,637 deafening supporters. On 9 May they lost the last North Staffordshire Infirmary Cup friendly with Stoke, losing 7–0 in a match they "scarcely tried" to win.

League table

Results
Port Vale's score comes first

Football League Second Division

Results by matchday

Matches

FA Cup

North Staffordshire Royal Infirmary Cup

Player statistics

Appearances

Top scorers

Transfers

Transfers in

Transfers out

References
Specific

General

Port Vale F.C. seasons
Port Vale